Rik Lopez (born 25 December 1979 in Northwick Park) is an English retired professional footballer.

Career
Lopez began as an apprentice at Arsenal, and also played youth football with Queens Park Rangers and Watford. However, he never made a league appearance for any of the three clubs. Lopez began his professional career with Bristol Rovers, making eight league appearances during the 2001–02 season.

References

External links

1979 births
Living people
English footballers
Arsenal F.C. players
Queens Park Rangers F.C. players
Watford F.C. players
Bristol Rovers F.C. players
English Football League players
Association football defenders